Euthyone simplex is a moth of the subfamily Arctiinae first described by Francis Walker in 1854. It is found in Mexico, Honduras, Panama and São Paulo, Brazil.

References

Lithosiini